Saidabad (also Romanized as Sa‘īdābād; also known as Sa‘dābād (Persian: سعد آباد)) is a village in Khararud Rural District, in the Central District of Khodabandeh County, Zanjan Province, Iran. At the 2006 census, its population was 87, in 22 families.

References 

Populated places in Khodabandeh County